The 1972–73 Montana Grizzlies basketball team represented the University of Montana during the 1972–73 NCAA Division I men's basketball season. Charter members of the Big Sky Conference, the Grizzlies were led by second-year head coach Jud Heathcote and played their home games on campus at Dahlberg Arena in Missoula, Montana. They finished the regular season at 13–13, with a 7–7 conference record.

The Big Sky conference tournament debuted three years later, in 1976.

Senior guard Mike Murray was named to the all-conference team and was the conference runner-up in scoring.

References

External links
Sports Reference – Montana Grizzlies: 1972–73 basketball season

Montana Grizzlies basketball seasons
Montana
Montana Grizzlies basketball
Montana Grizzlies basketball